The 2021 European Junior Mixed Team Judo Championships was held in Luxembourg City, Luxembourg on 12 September as part of the 2021 European Junior Judo Championships.

Results

Repechage

References

External links
 Contest Sheet
 

European Junior Judo Championships
 U21Team
Judo
European Championships, U21, Team
EUJ 2021